Aurel "Aurică" Beldeanu (born 5 March 1951), is a Romanian former professional footballer who played as a midfielder. Born in Dobroești, Ilfov County Beldeanu started his football career at Progresul București and played almost 100 matches for the team from the park with platans. Then he moved to FCM Reșița and played another 101 matches for the team from Valea Domanului. In 1976 Aurel Beldeanu signed with Universitatea Craiova, being part of the Craiova's second golden team, named as Craiova Maxima. He played 195 matches for Știința and entering in the hall of fame of this club. In the end of his career Beldeanu played for Constructorul Craiova and Chimia Râmnicu Vâlcea.

His nickname is Vulpea (The Fox), nickname received from Valentin Stănescu, due to his extraordinary intuition during the game. Beldeanu didn't have the impact of Balaci, Ștefănescu's performances or Crișan's speed, but Aurică Beldeanu was unanimously recognized as the most intelligent in the game, the most intuitive footballer of Craiova's great team.

International career
Aurel Beldeanu played in 18 matches for Romania and scored 4 goals.

Honours

 Progresul București
 Liga II: 1969–70

 Universitatea Craiova
 Liga I: 1979–80, 1980–81
 Romanian Cup: 1977, 1978, 1981, 1983

References

External links
 
 

1951 births
Living people
People from Ilfov County
Romanian footballers
Association football midfielders
Olympic footballers of Romania
Romania international footballers
Liga I players
Liga II players
FC Progresul București players
CSM Reșița players
CS Universitatea Craiova players
Chimia Râmnicu Vâlcea players